Lev Izrailevich Gorlitsky (3 March 1906 - 2 November 2003) was a Jewish Soviet weapons designer. Under the guidance of Gorlitsky special artillery pieces were designed to be mounted on T-34 self-propelled guns.

References

See also 
 List of Russian inventors

1906 births
2003 deaths
Weapon designers
Stalin Prize winners
Russian inventors
Soviet inventors
Soviet Jews